Wilhelm Harster (21 July 1904 – 25 December 1991) was a German policeman and war criminal. A high-ranking member in the SS and a Holocaust perpetrator during the Nazi era, he was twice convicted for his crimes by the Netherlands and later by West Germany. He had been employed by the government of Bavaria as a civil servant and was let go with a full pension after public outcry.

Education and early career
Harster graduated from University of Munich with a degree in 1927. Before the war, Harster was reservist with the Reichswehr, joining in 1920. In 1929 he joined the Kriminalpolizei (Criminal Police). He joined the Nazi Party on 1 May 1933, holding the party number of 3,226,954.

SS service
He joined the SS on 9 November 1933 with the serial number of 225,932. He joined the Sicherheitsdienst or SD on 29 October 1935 and eventually obtained the rank of Gruppenführer. He was also recalled to service in the Wehrmacht, serving in July 1940 as a member of a machinegun company. From 19 July 1940 until 29 August 1943, he was the commander of the Security Police and SD in the occupation of the Netherlands, where many of his war crimes occurred. He was implicated in the deaths of 104,000 Jews in the Holocaust, including Anne Frank. After his role in the occupation of the Netherlands, he was moved to Italy as the commander of the SD (Bolzano Transit Camp) there under Karl Wolff from 29 August 1943 until his capture.

Criminal convictions
Harster was arrested by the British Army where he was transferred to the Netherlands and tried for war crimes. In 1949, he was convicted and sentenced to 12 years for his role in the deportation and murder of Dutch Jews. He was released in 1953.

Upon release, he again became a civil servant in Bavaria, until he was retired due to public and media pressure in 1963. He kept his full pension. In 1967 he was tried alongside his two closest aides Wilhelm Zoepf and Gertrud Slottke and sentenced to an additional 15 years in jail for deportation of Jews to Auschwitz and Sobibor concentration camps. He was given credit for time served and was pardoned in 1969. His doctorate was officially removed from him. Harster died in 1991.

References

Citations

Sources

Christian Ritz, Schreibtischtäter vor Gericht. Das Verfahren vor dem Münchner Landgericht wegen der Deportation der niederländischen Juden (1959-1967). Paderborn: Ferdinand Schöningh, 2012; p. 257

1904 births
1991 deaths
Military personnel from Munich
Holocaust perpetrators in the Netherlands
Ludwig Maximilian University of Munich alumni
Recipients of German presidential pardons
German people imprisoned abroad
Prisoners and detainees of the Netherlands
Prisoners and detainees of Germany
Gestapo personnel
People from the Kingdom of Bavaria
Reich Security Main Office personnel
SS-Gruppenführer
20th-century Freikorps personnel